Cromwell Radio Group is a privately held radio broadcasting company based in Nashville, Tennessee. They currently own and operate 32 stations:

History
The company was founded in 1969 when founder and president of the Company, Bayard H. Walters applied to the Federal Communications Commission for permission to construct a new AM radio station in Hawesville, Kentucky. (That station was Country Music formatted WKCM, & is still owned by Cromwell to this day.) From that station, which went on the air in November of 1972, The company has grown by building new stations from scratch or buying underdeveloped stations and improving the facilities by increasing power and performance of those stations.

In 1990, The Tennessee market became part of the Cromwell family, when the company acquired WQZQ-FM (now WPRT-FM) & WYCQ-FM (now WBUZ). Also at the same time, The Company relocated its corporate headquarters from Hawesville, Kentucky to Nashville, Tennessee. Also since that time, the number of stations that Cromwell owns has since increased, as federal laws have permitted, the number of stations in each of the markets has been expanded to three or more. (As by rules of The FCC, as of 2011, allows a single company to own a maximum of five FM stations and two AM stations in any given market; translator stations however are exempted by the FCC, as is there no ownership limit to owning translator stations.)//

Radio Stations owned by The Cromwell Group

References

Radio broadcasting companies of the United States
Companies based in Nashville, Tennessee